HNLMS Philips van Almonde (F823) was a frigate of the . The ship was in service with the Royal Netherlands Navy from 1981 to 2002. The frigate was named after Dutch naval hero Philips van Almonde. The ship's radio call sign was "PADF".

Dutch service history
HNLMS Philips van Almonde was built at the Wilton-Fijenoord in Schiedam. The keel laying took place on 1 October 1977 and the launching on 11 August 1979. The ship was put into service on 2 December 1981.

From 2 July to 15 December 1984 the ship participated in STANAVFORLANT.

In 2001 after the 11 September attacks the ship took part in Operation Enduring Freedom.

In 2002 the vessel was decommissioned was and sold to the Hellenic Navy.

Greek service history
The ship was transferred in 2003 to the Hellenic Navy where the ship was renamed Themistoklis using the radio call sign "SZCG". It is in the Elli-class of frigates of the Hellenic Navy.

Notes

Kortenaer-class frigates
1979 ships
Frigates of the Cold War
Ships built by Wilton-Fijenoord